Khanyi Dhlomo (born 17 December 1972) is a South African journalist and magazine editor.

Early life
Dhlomo was born in Umlazi, KwaZulu-Natal, the daughter of Oscar Dhlomo She went to school at Durban Girls' College, in Durban, while there she won the Thandi Face Cover Girl competition at the age of 16, which sparked her interest in media.

She studied journalism at the University of Witwatersrand.

Career
In 1995, 20-year-old Dhlomo was hired as a news anchor at the South African Broadcasting Corporation (SABC), becoming the national broadcaster's first black newscaster. At the age of 22 Dhlomo was appointed as editor of the magazine, True Love. Within a year of her appointment, the magazine's circulation doubled from 70,000 to 140,000 and the magazine became the most widely read women's magazine in South Africa.

After eight years at True Love with a circulation of 1.9 million, Dhlomo stepped down as editor. Following the end of her first marriage she relocated to France where she worked as manager of South Africa's Tourism Board in Paris. In 2007 she graduated from Harvard Business School with an MBA which is where she met her second husband Chinezi Chijioke.

In 2007 she returned home to South Africa at which time she founded Ndalo Media in partnership with Naspers and successfully published the magazine, Destiny. In 2008 Dhlomo launched DestinyConnect.com which serves as the online extension of Destiny magazine and in July 2009 Destiny Man, edited by Kojo Baffoe was launched together with its online extension DestinyMan.com.

In 2013, Dhlomo launched the boutique department store, Luminance.

In 2018, in keeping with the closure of print-based media businesses worldwide, Dhlomo took the decision to close her media.

Awards
2001 AdVantage Magazine Editor of the Year
Most Influential Woman in South African Media 2003

References

External links
DestinyConnect.com
DestinyMan.com

South African editors
South African women editors
South African journalists
South African women journalists
1970 births
Living people
Harvard Business School alumni
People from Johannesburg
University of the Witwatersrand alumni
South African chief executives
Women chief executives
South African magazine editors
Women magazine editors